Pleurobema troschelianum, the Alabama clubshell, was a species of freshwater mussel, an aquatic bivalve mollusk in the family Unionidae, the river mussels.

This species was endemic to the United States. It is now extinct.

References

Bivalves described in 1852
Extinct invertebrates since 1500
troschelianum
Extinct animals of the United States
Taxonomy articles created by Polbot